Masaya is a department in Nicaragua. It is the country's smallest department by area (611 km2) and has a population of 397,632 (2021 estimate). The capital is the city of Masaya. It is famous among Nicaraguan people for its nickname, "La Cuna Del Folklore" which translates to (The Cradle of Folklore). It is also the site of the Masaya Volcano, an active 635m volcano which last erupted in 2016.

Municipalities
 Catarina
 La Concepción
 Masatepe
 Masaya
 Nandasmo
 Nindirí
 Niquinohomo
 San Juan de Oriente
 Tisma

References 

 
Departments of Nicaragua